The Kuiguang Pagoda of Dujiangyan City, Sichuan province, China, is a pagoda built in 1831 during the Qing dynasty.

Structure
The pagoda is 50 meters tall, hexagonal, and is the pagoda with the greatest number of floors in China, with 17. The pagoda is built on a low stone foundation, with the first floor being the largest, containing an arched doorway. The second floor marks the first set of eaves, and false doors, which are present on each subsequent floor. Some floors also have real doors.

Notes

References
Xu Xiaoying, ed. Zhongguo Guta Zaoxing. Beijing: Chinese Forest Press, 2007.

Architecture in China
Pagodas in China
Buildings and structures in Sichuan